Minuscule 885 (in the Gregory-Aland numbering), is a 15th-century Greek minuscule manuscript of the New Testament on paper. The manuscript has not survived in complete condition.

Description 

The codex contains the text of the Gospel of Mark, Gospel of Luke, and Gospel of John, with a commentary, on 486 paper leaves (size ). The text is written in one column per page, 29 lines per page.

The manuscript is lacunose in Gospel of Luke and in Gospel of John. The original manuscript contained also the Gospel of Matthew.

Text 
The Greek text of the codex Kurt Aland did not place in any Category.

It was not examined according to the Claremont Profile Method.

History 

According to F. H. A. Scrivener and C. R. Gregory it was written in the 15th century. Henry Stevenson dated it to the 14th century. Currently the manuscript is dated by the INTF to the 15th century.

It once belonged to Jerome Vignier († 1661) along with another manuscript formerly listed as minuscule 104e.
104e was delisted by Gregory in 1908.

The manuscript was described by Henry Stevenson. Gregory saw it in 1886.

The manuscript was added to the list of New Testament manuscripts by Scrivener (697e), Gregory (885e).

Currently the manuscript is housed at the Vatican Library (Reg. gr. 5), in Rome.

See also 

 List of New Testament minuscules (1–1000)
 Biblical manuscript
 Textual criticism
 Minuscule 884

References

Further reading 

 
 Henry Stevenson, Codices manuscripti Graeci Reginae Svecorum et Pii Pp. II. Bibliothecae Vaticanae, descripti praeside I.B. Cardinali Pitra, Rom 1888, p. 4.

External links 
 

Greek New Testament minuscules
15th-century biblical manuscripts
Manuscripts of the Vatican Library